El puñao de rosas (A Bunch of Roses) is a one-act zarzuela "of Andalusian customs" (de costumbres andaluzas) by Spanish composer Ruperto Chapí to a libretto by Carlos Arniches and . It was successfully premiered on 30 October 1902, at the Teatro Apolo in Madrid.

Roles

Music
There are six musical numbers. The introduction (No. 1) has a sort orchestral prelude, which is followed by an elaborate opening scene: Socorro's prediction is inserted into the chorus, and when she leaves, another chorus tune frames Rosario and Carmencilla's parts with Socorro's song (whose tune is that of the orchestral introduction) interrupting this scene twice. The same song is put into Rosario and Tarugo's duo (No. 2), the finale and culminative section of which is a zapateado. The second duo (No. 3) is in ABA1B1 form with a bolero in the B section. No. 4 is actually a sequence of separate scenes: a male chorus nocturne (with a habanera rhythm in orchestra) gives place to an agitated female chorus, which is followed by an arrieros tune. After this a comic trio is presented without any transition. No. 5 is famous for its final tanguillo performed by Carmencilla, and it is preceded by an introductive chorus and Rosario's copla. No. 6 is just a minute long and is not an independent piece: it is based on the A1 section from No. 3. For the Finale a variation of the concluding measures of No. 1 (Socorro's song tune) is used.

Musical numbers
 No. 1. Introduction and chorus. Una gitana vieja me dijo un día (Rosario, Socorro, Carmencilla, female chorus)
 No. 2. Duo. ¡Ay! Mare del alma mía, que güen porveni me espera (Rosario, Tarugo, with Socorro behind the scenes)
 No. 3. Duo. No te asustes tú, alma mía (Rosario, Pepe)
 No. 4 (a). Chorus:
 Va la tarde cayendo (male chorus, behind the scenes) —
 Como bandá de palomas (female chorus) —
 Arrierito, arriero, ¡mal haya tu suerte perra! (un arriero, behind the scenes) —
 No. 4 (b). Trio. Con perro, escopeta, morral y canana (los cazadores)
 No. 5. Tango:
 ¡Venga jaleo! ¡Venga jarana! (mixed chorus, with Rosario, El Señó Juan) —
 Yo sufro mientras tu gosas (Rosario, with Carmencilla, Pepe, mixed chorus) —
 No le cuentes ar cura, chiquiya (Carmencilla, with mixed chorus)
 No. 6. Scene. ¡Naide! ¡Toó está tranquilo! (Tarugo)
 Finale (instrumental)

Arrangements
Chapí composed a Pasodoble based on several tunes of the zarzuela. Ricardo Villa, a prominent wind band director, arranged Nos. 1 and 3 of the zarzuela making up a Fantasy.

Recordings
The order of the roles: Rosario – Socorro – Carmencilla – Pepe – Tarugo – 3 Huntsmen – An arriero.
Columbia 1953: Ana María Iriarte, Pilar Lorengar, Teresa Berganza, Manuel Ausensi, Arturo Díaz Martos, Juan Encabo, Gregorio Gil, Agustín S. Luque. Chorus: Cantores de Mardid (dir. ). Gran Orquesta da Cámara de Madrid. Ataúlfo Argenta (conductor). — No. 6 not recorded.
Zafiro 1959: Dolores Pérez (Lily Berchman), Delian Rubens, Emilia Rincón, Tino Moro, Eladio Cuevas, Santiago Ramalle, Tino Pardo, Fernando Hernández. Chorus: Coros de Radio Nacional de España. Orquesta de Cámara de Madrid. Enrique Navarro (conductor). — No. 1 is recorded with cuts (about half of its normal duration). This recording contains also the Pasadoble based on the tunes of the zarzuela.
Alhambra 1970: Carmen Sinovas, Pura María Martínez, Isabel Higueras, Antonio Blancas, José Peromingo, Juanito Navarro, Manolo Codeso, Alfonso del Real, Aurelio Rodríguez. Chorus: Cantores de Madrid (dir. ). Orquesta Filarmonía de España. Rafael Frühbeck de Burgos (conductor). — No. 6 and Finale not recorded.

The Pasodoble was recorded several times in different versions (orchestra, sextet etc.).

References

External links
 
 Diego Emilio Fernández Álvarez. El puñao de rosas (2007) on lazarzuela.webcindario.com

Spanish-language operas
1902 operas
Operas
Zarzuelas by Ruperto Chapí
Libretti by Carlos Arniches
Libretti by Ramón Asensio Más
Operas set in Spain
One-act operas